Patrick Bateman is the third EP by black metal band Krieg. The title comes from the starring character of the novel American Psycho. The album was recorded at Winterblut Studio, Germany, in 2003.

Track listing

Personnel 
 Imperial – vocals
 Phaedrus – guitar
 SM Daemon – bass
 MK – drums

2004 EPs
Krieg (band) albums